The Saddle Buster is a 1932 American Western film directed by Fred Allen and starring Tom Keene and Helen Foster.

Cast
 Tom Keene as Montana
 Helen Foster as Sunny Hurn
 Marie Quillan as Rita
 Robert Frazer as Rance
 Richard Carlyle as Bible Jude
 Charles Quigley as Cladgett
 Fred Burns as Dan Hurn
 Harry Bowen as Calgary
 Charles Whitaker as Keno
 Ben Corbett as Shorty
 Al Taylor as Blackie

(cast list as per AFI database)

References

External links

1932 films
American Western (genre) films
RKO Pictures films
1932 Western (genre) films
American black-and-white films
Films directed by Fred Allen (film editor)
1930s American films